Songbuk ng APO is the eleventh studio album by the Filipino trio Apo Hiking Society, released in early 1991 under Universal Records. This album includes the hits "Saan Na Nga Ba'ng Barkada" and "Paano?".

Track listing
"Saan Na Nga Ba'ng Barkada"
"Kailangang Malaman Mo"
"Maasahan Mo Ako"
"Di Ba?"
"Sabado Na Pare Ko"
"Labag sa Batas"
"Paano?"
"Huli Mo"
"Kung Gusto Mo, Gusto Ko Pa"
"Nasaan Na?"
"Minamahal Kong Pilipinas"

References

External links
The Official Apo Hiking Society Website

1991 albums
APO Hiking Society albums